Church of St Peter & St Paul is a  Grade I listed church in Cranfield, Bedfordshire, England. It became a listed building on 23 January 1961.

See also
Grade I listed buildings in Bedfordshire

References

Church of England church buildings in Bedfordshire
Grade I listed churches in Bedfordshire
Peter and Paul